is a subway station on the Kyoto Municipal Subway Karasuma Line in Shimogyo-ku, Kyoto, Japan.

Lines
Kyoto Municipal Subway Karasuma Line (Station Number: K10)

Layout
The station has an island platform serving two tracks.

Platforms

See also
 List of railway stations in Japan

References

Railway stations in Japan opened in 1981
Railway stations in Kyoto Prefecture